Hochbergellus is a genus of air-breathing land snails, animal pulmonate gastropod mollusks in the family Polygyridae.

This genus of snails has only one species, which is not distinguishable from species of the genus Vespericola on the basis of shell characters. The two genera are distinguished only by internal anatomical characters.

Distribution
Hochbergellus  is restricted to coastal Oregon, U.S.A.

Species
The sole species in this genus is:

Hochbergellus hirsutus Roth and Miller, 1992

References

Polygyridae